Twisted Souls is a horror novel written by Shaun Hutson.

External links
 The official Shaun Hutson website, run by a fan with the input of the author himself

2005 British novels
British horror novels